Ullu Baraaye Farokht Nahi is a Pakistani drama television serial based on the afsana of the same name by Amna Mufti which was first published in 2009 in a monthly Urdu journal Shuaa. Directed by Kashif Nisar, the serial stars Noman Ijaz, Sohail Ahmed, Saba Qamar, Uzma Hassan, Irsa Ghazal, Yumna Zaidi and Noman Masood in prominent roles. Deals with the subject of feudalism and Watta satta, the series serves as a dark indictment on a society where men can abuse their power with impunity.

The series received huge praise due to its performances and storyline and was nominated in all categories at annual Lux Style Awards.

Cast 
 Noman Ijaz as Mian Ghulam Farid
 Saba Qamar as Gul E Rana
 Noman Masood as Wali Muhammad
 Sohail Ahmed as Ishaq Malkana
 Yumna Zaidi as Aasiya
 Omair Rana as Sir Chauhan
 Kamran Mujahid as Ghulam Ali
 Irsa Ghazal as Aapa Bi
 Uzma Hassan as Sajida 
 Saleem Mairaj as the Fakir
 Nargis Rasheed as Batool
 Hina Rizvi as Fatima
 Faiza Gillani
maria wasti

Story
In a small village, a long standing feud comes between the families of two estranged brothers; older brother, Mian Yaqoob and younger brother, Mianji. Their children are married in a 'Vatta Satta' (exchange marriage). Life takes a dark turn when one brother's daughter is murdered by her uncle, in revenge for his son who had been murdered years prior. The killer's daughter now has to survive in the household of the murdered daughter. Will this feud come to end without both brother sacrificing everyone they love?

Broadcast and release
The Series originally premiered on Hum TV from 30 April 2013.

The show also aired in India on Zindagi from 3 February 2015 to 21 March 2015 under title Aaj Rang Hai'.

Since mid-2020, it is available for streaming on OTT platform ZEE5. In August 2020, the series was made available on Hum TV's YouTube Channel.

Awards
Hum Award for Best Actor in a negative role to Noman Ijaz
13th Lux Style Awards for Best Drama Writer to Amna Mufti.

Nominations
13th Lux Style Awards for Best TV Serial - Satellite
13th Lux Style Awards for Best TV Actress to Irsa Ghazal
13th Lux Style Awards for Best TV Actor to Noman Ijaz
13th Lux Style Awards for Best TV Director to Kashif Nisar

References

External links 
 Official website
 

2013 Pakistani television series debuts
Urdu-language television shows
Hum TV original programming
Pakistani drama television series
Zee Zindagi original programming